Mirbaz is a village in the Punjab province of Pakistan. It is part of Sahiwal District and is located at 30°41'0N 73°40'30E with an altitude of 167 metres (551 feet).

References

Populated places in Sahiwal District